Camilo Velozo Zuñiga (born 2 February 1996) is a Chilean karateka. He won one of the bronze medals in the men's kumite 67 kg event at the 2018 World Karate Championships held in Madrid, Spain. At the 2019 Pan American Games held in Lima, Peru, he won the silver medal in the men's kumite 67 kg event.

In 2021, he competed at the World Olympic Qualification Tournament held in Paris, France hoping to qualify for the 2020 Summer Olympics in Tokyo, Japan. He was eliminated in his third match by Sultan Al-Zahrani of Saudi Arabia.

He competed in the men's kumite 67 kg event at the 2022 World Games held in Birmingham, United States. He won the silver medal in his event at the 2022 South American Games held in Asunción, Paraguay.

Achievements

References 

Living people
1996 births
Place of birth missing (living people)
Chilean male karateka
Pan American Games medalists in karate
Pan American Games silver medalists for Chile
Karateka at the 2019 Pan American Games
Medalists at the 2019 Pan American Games
South American Games medalists in karate
South American Games silver medalists for Chile
South American Games bronze medalists for Chile
Competitors at the 2018 South American Games
Competitors at the 2022 South American Games
Competitors at the 2022 World Games
21st-century Chilean people